Dishwalla is an American alternative rock band from Santa Barbara, California. The band's name comes from a Hindi term for a person providing satellite TV to a neighborhood ("dish" + walla). In a Vox interview, lead guitarist Rodney Browning Cravens claimed the band took the name from a Wired magazine article. The band is best known for their 1996 hit song "Counting Blue Cars".

History
In 1994, the band recorded "It's Going to Take Some Time" on the tribute album If I Were a Carpenter featuring cover versions of songs by The Carpenters.

In 1996, the single "Counting Blue Cars" from the 1995 album Pet Your Friends climbed to number 15 on the Billboard Hot 100 chart and topped the Modern Rock Tracks chart, bringing the band mainstream success. The track earned them a Billboard Award for "Best Rock Song" for 1996 as well as two ASCAP Awards for "Rock Track of the Year" in both 1996 and 1997. Their 1998 follow-up album, And You Think You Know What Life's About, failed to sustain the level of popularity achieved by "Counting Blue Cars".

In 2002, Dishwalla released their third album Opaline on Immergent Records. The album was produced by Gregg Wattenberg. 
The band followed up with the 2005 self-titled album Dishwalla produced by Sylvia Massy, Bill Szymczyk, and Ryan Greene; it was released on Orphanage Records. This would be the last album with original lead singer J.R. Richards.

Dishwalla has since made more ventures into the limelight. In 1995 the song "Counting Blue Cars" was featured in the movie Empire Records. "Pretty Babies" is on the Blast from the Past soundtrack. In 1998 landed the song "Truth Serum" in The Avengers; in 1999, the song "Stay Awake" was featured in the movie Stir of Echoes''' and the song "Find Your Way Back Home" was featured in the movie American Pie. In 2002 the song "Home" was in the movie The Banger Sisters and The WB series Charmed spotlighted Dishwalla as musical guests in one episode. Other TV shows that have used their songs include Smallville, The OC, and NCIS. They have also been mentioned several times in the show How I Met Your Mother. The band released a live album in 2003, Live... Greetings From The Flow State.

Five singles charted on Billboard. In 1996, "Counting Blue Cars" peaked at No. 15 on the Hot 100 but climbed to No. 5 on both the Adult Top 40 and Hot 100 Airplay charts, No. 4 on the Top 40 Mainstream charts, No. 2 on the Mainstream Rock charts, and No. 1 on the Modern Rock charts. "Charlie Brown's Parents" hit No. 24 on the Mainstream Rock charts. The following year "Give" was a No. 26 Adult Top 40 single. In 1998, "Once in a While" reached No. 17 on the Mainstream Rock charts and No. 20 on the Modern Rock charts. Finally, "Somewhere in the Middle" hit No. 25 on the Adult Top 40 charts in 2002.

Reformation
After deciding to take a break in 2005, the band reformed and began touring in 2008 with a modified lineup consisting of original members bassist Scot Alexander, guitarist Rodney Cravens, keyboardist Jim Wood, and drummer George Pendergast. The lineup featured long-time friend, Justin Fox, singer of the Santa Barbara band Tripdavon, as a "Special Guest Vocalist".

On March 15, 2009, Dishwalla was asked to play a benefit concert for Tea Fire victims Lance and Carla Hoffman, who were badly burned in fires which hit Santa Barbara in November 2008. The hugely successful event was put on by coordinated efforts with Santa Barbara City Fire, Santa Barbara County Fire, Montecito Fire, and  the Carpinteria/Summerland Fire departments.

In September 2012, the band announced on their official Facebook page a benefit concert on October 13 to raise money for George Pendergast's "Rockshop Academy", his non-profit youth music program. Along with this announcement, Dishwalla quietly let it be known from personal Facebook posts by the members what fans had long speculated: J.R. Richards had been replaced with long-time friend and "special guest vocalist", Justin Fox, from the band Tripdavon. Richards has since released many albums as a solo artist.

The next two years in 2013 and 2014 the band toured extensively across the United States and the world. The band has shared the stage with many other notable acts such as Eric Burdon, Collective Soul, Vertical Horizon, Tonic, Stroke 9, and Nine Days just in 2014 alone. Any initial doubts about Justin Fox's ability to take over as front man are gone; the outpouring of support by fans worldwide has been substantial.

2015 was the 20th anniversary of Dishwalla's chart topping Pet Your Friends album release which launched their careers. To commemorate the event the band rerecorded a 20th Anniversary Edition of their hit "Counting Blue Cars" with new vocalist Justin Fox.

Current
On July 14, 2017, Dishwalla released their 5th studio album, "Juniper Road", marking the band's first full-length studio release in twelve years. During the summer of 2017 in support of the new album, the band joined the "Rockin' Road Trip '17" tour, sharing the stage with notable acts such as Fuel, Marcy Playground, Gin Blossoms and others. Their summer dates included an appearance at the Santa Barbara Bowl on September 18, 2017, with Tears for Fears.

Members
Current
 Rodney Browning Cravens – lead guitar, backing vocals (1993–2005, 2008–present)
 Scot Alexander – bass, backing vocals (1993–2005, 2008–present)
 George Pendergast – drums (1993–1998, 2008–present)
 Jim Wood – keyboards (1996–2005, 2008–present)
 Justin Fox – lead vocals (2008–present)

Justin Fox
Justin David Fox (born August 17, 1979) is the current lead singer for Dishwalla. He began his music career as the founding member and singer for the alternative rock band Tripdavon which was also from Santa Barbara before joining Dishwalla in 2008.

Between the years active in Tripdavon and before heading back out to tour heavily with Dishwalla, Fox went back to school earning his Juris Doctor and passing the California bar examination in June 2013 to practice as an entertainment attorney.

In addition to the contributions and successes of his own musical acts as a singer and songwriter, Fox has engaged in other projects as both a music producer and recording engineer. Most notably he was credited as assistant recording engineer to Katy Perry for the production of her platinum hit album Prism including the hit "Roar". Perry described her experience recording in Fox's Montecito recording studio in the October 2013 issue of The New Yorker.

Former
 J. R. Richards – lead vocals, rhythm guitar, keyboards (1993–2005)
 Pete Maloney – drums (1998–2005)
 Greg Kolanek – keyboards (1993–1994)

Timeline

Discography

Studio albums

EPs and live albumsGems (2001)Santa Claus Lane (2003)Live... Greetings from the Flow State (2003)Santa Claus Lane II (2004)Southeast Asia (2004)Alive (2022)

Singles

Non-album songs
 "It's Going to Take Some Time", featured on the 1994 Carpenters tribute album, If I Were a Carpenter "Policy of Truth", featured on the 1998 Depeche Mode tribute album, For the Masses 
 "Find Your Way Back Home", featured on the 1999 soundtrack album, American Pie''

See also
1990s in music
List of alternative music artists

References

External links

Official website

Alternative rock groups from California
American post-grunge musical groups
Musical groups established in 1992
Musical groups disestablished in 2006
Musical groups reestablished in 2008